Boronia lanceolata is a plant in the citrus family Rutaceae and is endemic to northern parts of the Northern Territory and Queensland. It is an erect shrub with many branches, elliptic to lance-shaped leaves and white or pink, four-petalled flowers. It is the most common boronia in the Northern Territory.

Description
Its branches and leaves are covered with star-like hairs. Unlike in other Northern Territory boronias, the petals are longer and wider than the sepals. Flowering occurs from May to February.

Taxonomy and naming
Boronia lanceolata was first formally described in 1859 by Ferdinand von Mueller who published the description in  Fragmenta phytographiae Australiae. The specific epithet (lanceolata) is a Latin word  meaning "spearlike".

Distribution and habitat
This boronia grows in heath, woodland and forest on sandstome between Mornington Island and Westmoreland in Queensland to the Macadam Range and Tiwi Islands in the Northern Territory, where it is the most common boronia.

Conservation
This boronia is classed as of "least concern" under the Northern Territory Government Parks and Wildlife Conservation Act and the Queensland Government Nature Conservation Act 1992.

References 

lanceolata
Flora of the Northern Territory
Flora of Queensland
Plants described in 1859
Taxa named by Ferdinand von Mueller